Centro del Sur Mall is a shopping mall in Ponce, Puerto Rico. At the time of its inauguration in 1962, it was Puerto Rico's largest mall and “the most modern mall in the Caribbean.” It is located at the intersection of Puerto Rico routes PR-163 (Avenida Las Américas) and PR-1 (Bulevar Miguel Pou). Its original building cost was $2,500,000 ($ in  dollars). It has been enlarged several times; including in 1991, in 2005, and again in 2010; this last time to accommodate the megastore Burlington.

History
The mall opened on 13 October 1962, forever changing the mom-and-pop retail paradigm of shoppers in southern Puerto Rico. At the time of its opening, it consisted of 120,000 sq ft of retail space. This was increased to 220,000 sq ft in 1991. Accessed 9 February 2018.</ref> An additional enlargement occurred in 2005 bringing the total square footage to 249,000. In 2010, a new tenant, Burlington Coat Factory, contracted with CCM for a facility requiring 70,000sf over what the maximum available single-store space was at the time and its owner (Commercial Centers Management) did a build-to-suit for the new tenant bringing the total mall footage to the current 300,000sf. Various adjacent stores, banks, and restaurants bring the total effective area to over 350,000. It is owned and managed by Commercial Centers Management, the largest commercial centers management company in Puerto Rico. It is currently (2018) anchored by Marshalls and Burlington department stores. The opening of Centro del Sur, Puerto Rico's first large-scale shopping plaza, marked southern Puerto Rico's turning point from a mom-and pap store based business model to a large-scale central shopping plaza paradigm. The mall is unique in that it is the only mall in Puerto Rico that provides mall space for community events, and the only mall with a yearly Miss event with its Miss Centro del Sur Mall pageant.

Notability

Centro del Sur made history as Puerto Rico's largest mall until the 1968 opening of Plaza Las Americas in San Juan. Randall Peffer, of Lonely Planet, calls Centro del Sur "the place where shopping addicts head to when they need 'mall fixes'". During the 300th anniversary of the founding of the city of Ponce, the mall gained prominence for being the mall closest to the Ponce Historic Zone.

Design
A unique characteristic of this mall is its zig-zag prefab reinforced concrete roof which is not found in any other mall in Puerto Rico. The mall's main corridor is oriented in a north-south axis, with a shorter east-west axis and a smaller east-west hallway. Centro del Sur is the first and only mall in Puerto Rico with a truss zig-zag prefab concrete roof system.

Tenants
Centro del Sur has over 50 stores and more than 30 kiosks and food court vendors. An area for community events at the mall is unique among malls in Puerto Rico. The Mall has been southern Puerto Rico's regional outlet for a number of major national departmental chains including Kresge, Barker's, Marshalls and Burlington. The mall is managed by Commercial Centers Management.

Location
The mall is located on the southwestern corner of Miguel Pou Boulevard (PR-1) and Las Americas Avenue (PR-163). The main branch of the Ponce Public Library is within walking distance west of the mall, and Urbanizacion La Alhambra, Puerto Rico's first upper-class suburban development, is located diagonally across from the Mall to the northwest. This puts it just outside the Ponce Historic Zone.

A limited-access highway, PR-12, also known as Avenida Santiago de los Caballeros, and which opened to the public in 1995, was built just west of the mall providing easy access to it. The mall is flanked by several outlying banks, and restaurants which together bring the total effective retail area within the plaza to over 350,000 square feet The mall is also readily accessible via taxi service with the Union Taxi terminal depot located at the mall's main eastern entrance.

Accolades
Centro del Sur Mall was the venue used by Melina León to debut her new album “Corazón de Mujer” Other talent shows have also taken place here. On 24 December 1966, the mall became the first public place in Puerto Rico where Santa Claus landed via a helicopter to hand out gifts to waiting children, a marketing and advertising stunt. Today, the yearly “Miss Centro del Sur” event takes place instead.

References

Buildings and structures in Ponce, Puerto Rico
Shopping malls in Puerto Rico